Joseph Koto (born  1. January 1960, died 14. October 2021) was a Senegalese football manager and international player. He was head coach of the Senegal national football team between July 2012 and October 2012.

References

External links
 
 

1960 births
2021 deaths
1986 African Cup of Nations players
Senegal international footballers
Senegal national football team managers
Senegalese footballers
Association football forwards
Senegalese football managers